Larry Chesky, born Lawrence J. Ciszewski, (November 17, 1933 – January 25, 2011, Holyoke, MA) was an American accordion player, Polka band leader, inductee in the International Polka Hall of Fame, and manager of the Rex Records label.

Early life and career
Chesky would take up the accordion first at the age of six and organized his first Polka band by the age of 13, debuting at the Cavalier Restaurant in Chicopee as "The Polka Dots".  After graduating from Holyoke High School, he attended the Hartt School of Music. In the mid-1950s Chesky signed with the Musico Recording Company, forming the Larry Chesky Orchestra, with one of his best-known early hits being "Our Gang Oberek", created in 1956. Among Chesky's early influences was Ray Henry and his orchestra, an earlier pioneer of the Big Band Eastern style from Connecticut, who Chesky and his band would later perform with at Mountain Park. Chesky and his orchestra would remain a fixture at the amusement park when not touring or recording, starting regular performances there before 1955; he would perform there weekly with a number of other musicians for more than 30 years, until the park's closure in 1987.

Chesky would spend much of his early career touring the Eastern Polka circuit from New York to Chicago, and was inducted into the International Polka Association Hall of Fame in 1985, having recorded over 100 albums. He was a proponent of the "Big Band" or "Eastern" style of Polka, which features more band members (greater than ten), and a focus on horn and reed instruments, than the typical Polka band. Over the years he and his band would back a number of headliners, including singers Barbara Mandrell, Bobby Vinton, and James Darren.

In 1974 Chesky would launch Modern Mail International, a catalog business selling Polish heritage novelties. By the 1990s he had largely retired from his record business, continuing to tour with Polka festivals across the country selling memorabilia. He remained active in Freemasons, particularly as a Shriner. He and his orchestra continued to perform with some regularity into the 2000s. One of his last public appearances was as a guest of a "polkathon" on UMass Amherst's WMUA in October 2010. Chesky died of heart failure at Massachusetts General Hospital in Boston, on January 25, 2011, at the age of 77.

Influence and legacy
Jimmy Sturr, the 18 time Grammy Award Winner for Best Polka Album, said of him: "He was one of my idols. I grew up on him...I modeled my band after his Eastern style." Lenny Gomulka, the twelve time Polka Grammy Nominee, said that Larry Chesky was a "pioneer who changed and enhanced the image of polka to the Big Band sound." Describing the origins of Tex-Mex/ska polka band Brave Combo, cofounder Carl Finch cited Chesky's sound as influential in the Grammy Award Winning band's early search for a style they felt still represented the music of "the common people", in an increasingly corporate cultural landscape.

Orchestra members

Instrumentalists featured:
 Larry Chesky (accordion)
 Regina Kujawa (accordion)
 Chet Dragon (trumpet)
 Bob Skibinski (trumpet)
 Stan Malek (trumpet)
 Ken Morey (trumpet)
 Eddie Martin (trumpet)
 Richie Pezda (clarinet)
 Bill Wezesien (clarinet)
 Don Szczebak (clarinet)
 Walt Wagner (clarinet)
 Dan Murphy (clarinet)
 Bill Kosewski (piano)
 Ronnie Pezda (drums)
 Eddie Poudier (drums)
 Walt Jordan (bass)
 "Papa Joe" Chesky (bass)

Vocalists featured:
 Larry Chesky
 Regina Kujawa
 Andy Szuberla
 Gene Wiśniewski
 "Papa Joe" Chesky
 Chet Dragon

Selected discography

References

External links

 Larry Chesky - Topic, YouTube
 Musico Records discography
 Modern Mail International Catalog, circa 1977

20th-century accordionists
20th-century American musicians
Polka musicians
People from Holyoke, Massachusetts
University of Hartford Hartt School alumni
American accordionists
American Freemasons
American people of Polish descent
Musicians from Massachusetts
1933 births
2011 deaths
Bandleaders